State Highway 78 is a New Zealand State Highway connecting central Timaru with its port. It holds the record for New Zealand's shortest State Highway, with a length of just under .

Route
State Highway 78 begins at State Highway 1 just north of the CBD. The road then proceeds northeast over the South Island Main Trunk Railway, before turning anticlockwise around a loop, passing under itself parallel to the railway line. The highway terminates at the intersection of Port Loop Road with Marine Parade. It is believed to be the only State Highway that crosses itself (not counting motorway on/offramps).

See also
List of New Zealand state highways

References

External links
 New Zealand Transport Agency

78
Geography of Canterbury, New Zealand
Transport in Canterbury, New Zealand